United Nations Security Council resolution 724, adopted unanimously on 15 December 1991, after reaffirming resolutions 713 (1991) and 721 (1991) and noting a report by the Secretary-General Javier Pérez de Cuéllar on the situation in the Socialist Federal Republic of Yugoslavia, the council agreed to carry forward proposals for a planned peacekeeping operation in Yugoslavia and decided to establish a committee of the Security Council to consider matters relating to the arms embargo on the country.

Acting under Chapter VII of the United Nations Charter, the council requested all Member States to report on the measures they have taken to implement a general and complete embargo on all weapons and military equipment to Yugoslavia. It also decided to establish a committee of the Security Council to examine the measures Member States they have taken, including violations of the embargo and ways to strengthen it, requesting all Member States co-operate with the committee. The powers of the committee would be extended to other areas in subsequent resolutions on the situation.

The resolution also encouraged the Secretary-General to pursue humanitarian efforts in Yugoslavia, in conjunction with Member States and international organisations to address the needs of the civilian population.

This resolution was the last resolution the Soviet Union participated before Russia would takeover its seat.

See also
 Croatian War of Independence
 List of United Nations Security Council Resolutions 701 to 800 (1991–1993)
 Slovenian Independence War
 United Nations Protection Force
 Yugoslav Wars

References

External links
 
Text of the Resolution at undocs.org

 0724
 0724
1991 in Yugoslavia
 0724
United Nations Security Council sanctions regimes
December 1991 events
Sanctions against Yugoslavia